Greathead is a surname. Notable people with the surname include:

 Aston Greathead, New Zealand artist
 Greathead (1808 cricketer), 19th-century English cricketer for the MCC (first name unknown)
 Henry Greathead (1757–1818), British boat builder
 James Henry Greathead (1844–1896), British engineer